Pośród niesnasków Pan Bóg uderza... - "Among the discord God rings [a bell]..." - is a poem written by Juliusz Słowacki in 1848, in which the poet prophesied the coming of a first Slavic pope.

The poem was not popular with Słowacki's contemporaries and was mostly forgotten until a century later, when it gained huge popularity after Polish cardinal Karol Wojtyła was elected pope in 1978, as it has explicit predictions regarding a future Slavic pope (in Polish: "Słowiański Papież"). It was frequently cited by John Paul II.

References

External links
Poem on Polish Wikisource

Polish poems
Works by Juliusz Słowacki
Cultural depictions of Pope John Paul II
1848 poems